Zhang Xuezhong may refer to:

 Zhang Xuezhong (general) (1899–1995), Republic of China general
 Zhang Xuezhong (politician) (born 1943), Communist Party chief of Sichuan Province, China
 Zhang Xuezhong (academic) (born 1976), dismissed lecturer at East China University of Political Science and Law